Zohra ben Lakhdar Akrout (born 12 March 1943) is a Tunisian spectroscopist specializing in developing new spectroscopic methods to study the influence of pollutants on the quality of air, water, and plants. She earned in 2005 the L’Oréal-UNESCO Awards for Women in Science.

Career 
Ben Lakhdar graduated in 1968 from Pierre and Marie Curie University. She earned her PhD from the same university in 1978 with a thesis entitled "Application à l'étude de la raie 4047Å de mercure de la méthode à balayage magnétique" (study of the line shape of 4047Å mercury line using a tunable magnetic field). She went back to Tunisia to become professor in 1982 at the Tunis University and served as director of the Laboratory of Atomic Molecular Spectroscopy and Applications (LSAMA). She was a founding member of the Tunisian Physics Society and a founding member of the Tunisian Astronomy Society.

Honours 
She was elected in 1992 to the Islamic World Academy of Sciences. She is a fellow of the African Academy of Science since 2006. She became senior associate member at the Abdus Salam International Centre for Theoretical Physics (ICTP). She earned in 2005 the L’Oréal-UNESCO Awards for Women in Science for "experiments and models in infrared spectroscopy and its applications to pollution, detection and medicine". She was identified as a Science hero by The My Hero Project.

References 

Tunisian women scientists
Tunisian women chemists
20th-century women scientists
21st-century women scientists
Tunisian women physicists
Tunisian chemists
1943 births
L'Oréal-UNESCO Awards for Women in Science laureates
Living people
Fellows of the African Academy of Sciences